The 1984 Swedish motorcycle Grand Prix was the eleventh round of the 1984 Grand Prix motorcycle racing season. It took place on the weekend of 9–12 August at the Scandinavian Raceway.

Classification

500 cc

References

Swedish motorcycle Grand Prix
Swedish
Motorcycle
Swedish motorcycle Grand Prix